Gordon Henry Jr. (born 1955) is a poet and fiction writer.

Life and work
Henry was born in Philadelphia, Pennsylvania. He is an enrolled member of the White Earth Band of Ojibwe of Minnesota. He received his PhD in Literature from the University of North Dakota and is currently a professor of English at Michigan State University.

Henry's literary works have been recognized and highlighted at Michigan State University in their Michigan Writers Series.

Henry's  first novel, The Light People (1994), explores Chippewa life and culture and the style takes some of its elements from the Chippewa style of oral story telling.  He  co-authored the textbook Ojibwa  and has released a book of poetry,  The Failure of Certain Charms, (Earthworks). Gordon has also published short stories and poems in various journals and anthologies.

Further reading
Maceda, Maria Theresa Gilbert.  Nuevas Tendencias De La Literatura Indian de Norte Americana: Entrevista A Gordon Henry, Escritor Anishinabe.  A Distancia: Revista de la Universidad Nacional de Educacion a Distancia.  Primavera. Madrid, Spain. (1995). xxxiv - xxxviii.
Arce, Mario Luce. Henry: Los Nativos Americanos No Quieran Cargado con Imagenes del Pasado"  La Nueva España de Asturias (Cultura). 27 de Mayo de 1995.  Oviedo, España
Blaeser, Kimberly M.  "The New "Frontier" of  Native American Literature: Dis-Arming History with Tribal Humor."  Native American Perspectives on Literature  and History. Ed. Alan R. Velie. Norman: University of Oklahoma Press, 1995.  37 -50.
Stirrup, David. "Narrative Community, Community Narrative: (Anti) Academic Discourse in Gordon Henry's The Light People." Genre (39:1/2 2006).
Contemporary Authors  Detroit: Gale Research, 1995 
 Kratzert, M. "Native American Literature: Expanding the Canon", Collection Building Vol. 17, 1, 1998, p. 4

References

External links
 https://gordonhenry.com.sapo.pt/Main_Page.html
 http://www.english.msu.edu/documents/Henry_Gordon_Jr.pdf
 http://www.english.msu.edu/staff/Detail.asp?_GroupID_3=3&AdvancedSearch=True&ContactID=15&RecPos=14

University of North Dakota alumni
Michigan State University faculty
Living people
1955 births
Native American poets
American Book Award winners
Native American people from Pennsylvania
Poets from Pennsylvania